Frederick John Harris (4 July 1937 – 1 April 1965) (known as John Harris) was a South African schoolteacher and anti-apartheid campaigner who turned to terrorism and was executed after a bomb attack on a railway station. He was Chairman of SANROC (the South African Non Racial Olympic Committee), which in 1964 petitioned the International Olympic Committee to have South Africa excluded from the Olympics for fielding a white-only team. After being arrested for his political activities, he became a member of the African Resistance Movement (ARM).

Crime
On 24 July 1964, Harris telephoned the Johannesburg Railway Police to inform them that a bomb had been planted on a whites-only platform of Johannesburg Park Station. The bomb exploded shortly afterwards, killing a 77-year-old woman and injuring 23 others.

Trial and execution
Harris was represented at trial by David Soggot, who later became one of South Africa's most prominent civil rights lawyers. Harris was convicted of murder, and hanged on 1 April 1965. He went to the gallows singing We Shall Overcome, a Civil Rights Movement protest song.

Burial and legacy
At his cremation, 15-year-old Peter Hain (whose family had been friendly with Harris) stood and recited  A time to kill and a time to heal; a time to break down and a time to build up. A memorial to remember Harris's life was held around the 40th anniversary of his death at Freedom Park in Pretoria.

Harris was the only white person hanged for crimes committed in resistance to apartheid (although numerous more were assassinated, such as Ruth First). All those executed for such crimes were honoured by South Africa's president, Jacob Zuma, on the occasion of the launch of the Gallows Museum at the C Max Pretoria Central Correctional Centre on 15 December 2011: "The 134 men were terrorists or trouble makers to the authorities then. But to their people and families, they were freedom fighters who wanted to see a free, democratic and non-sexist South Africa."

Notes and references

Further reading

External links
Tribute: On the occasion of a memorial for John Harris (1937 - 1965) at South African History Online
Frederick John Harris at South African History Online

People executed by South Africa by hanging
1937 births
1965 deaths
White South African anti-apartheid activists
Executed South African people
20th-century executions by South Africa
Liberal Party of South Africa politicians
Executed activists
People executed for murder
South African people convicted of murder
People convicted of murder by South Africa